Červený Kláštor (Goral: Švaby) is a small village and municipality in the far north Kežmarok District in the Prešov Region of northern Slovakia, near the Polish border, in the Zamagurie region.

History
A Camaldolese monastery was established on this location, then part of the Habsburg-ruled Kingdom of Hungary, in 1710.

In 1782, it was secularized as part of Emperor Joseph II's campaign against monastic orders that, in his view, didn't pursue useful activities. The monastery building still exists however (see photo).

The present village was founded in 1828.

Geography
The municipality lies at an altitude of 465 metres and covers an area of 3.043 km2.
It has a population of about 222 people. It lies 8 km east of the centre of Zamagurie region, Spišská Stará Ves. The governing body of the Pieniny national park is located in the village.
Dunajec river, which makes border with Poland, flows near the village. It is used for tourist purposes for rafting. Other attractions in or near the village include the Červený kláštor (spelled with a lower-case "k"; literally Red Monastery) or walking in the surrounding mountains of Pieniny. Since 2006, there is a new bridge for pedestrians in operation, connecting Červený Kláštor and Sromowce Niżne.

Gallery

Genealogical resources

The records for genealogical research are available at the state archive "Statny Archiv in Levoca, Slovakia"

 Roman Catholic church records (births/marriages/deaths): 1766-1832 (parish B)
 Lutheran church records (births/marriages/deaths): 1809-1920 (parish B)

See also
 List of municipalities and towns in Slovakia

References

External links
 http://cervenyklastor.sk Official homepage
Surnames of living people in Cerveny Klastor

Villages and municipalities in Kežmarok District